Charles McCaughan is an American actor and director.

Filmography

Director and writer
Angel on Fire (2005)
Picture of Priority (1998)

Acting
The Cisco Kid (1994, TV) - Haynie
V.I. Warshawski (1991) - Trumble Grafalk
Legal Tender (1991) - Bud Rennick
Impulse (1990) - Frank Munoff
Slaves of New York (1989, Merchant Ivory Film) - Sherman
Waxwork (1988) - Inspector Roberts
The House on Carroll Street (1988) - Salwen Aide #1
Quicksilver (1986) - 'Airborne'
Hot Resort (1985) - Daryl
The Bostonians (1984, Merchant Ivory Film) - Music Hall Police Officer
Heat and Dust (1983, Merchant Ivory Film) - Chid - 1982 In Satipur Town
Jane Austen in Manhattan (1980, Merchant Ivory Film) - Billie

TV series (guest)
Silk Stalkings - "Community Service" (1995) - Bailiff
War of the Worlds - "The Defector" (1990) - 'Kemo'
Matlock - "The Blues Singer" (1989) - Dennis Johnson
Jake and the Fatman - "Why Can't You Behave?" (1989) - Actor
Crime Story - "Ground Zero" (1987) - Actor
Miami Vice - "The Great McCarthy" (1984) - Dale Gifford

References

 

American male film actors
American film directors
Year of birth missing (living people)
Living people